John Twist (July 14, 1898 – February 11, 1976) was an American screenwriter whose career spanned four decades.

Born in Albany, Missouri, Twist began his career in the silent film era, providing the story for such films as Breed of Courage, Blockade, and The Big Diamond Robbery. He earned his first screenwriting credit for The Yellowback in 1929. Twist died in Beverly Hills, California.

Filmography

 Little Women (1933) 
 La Cucaracha (1934)
 Annie Oakley (1935)
 Another Face (1935) 
 The Last Outlaw (1936)
 We Who Are About to Die (1937) 
 The Toast of New York (1937)
 Next Time I Marry (1938)
 The Great Man Votes (1939)
 The Saint Strikes Back (1939)
 Too Many Girls (1940)
 Powder Town (1942)
 Pittsburgh (1942)
 Bombardier (1943) 
 This Man's Navy (1945)
 Sinbad the Sailor (1947)
 Tycoon (1947) 
 Colorado Territory (1949)
 Dallas (1950)
 Fort Worth (1951)
 The Big Trees (1952)
 So Big (1953)
 King Richard and the Crusaders (1954)
 The Sea Chase (1955)
 Helen of Troy (1956)
 Serenade (1956)
 Santiago (1956)
 Band of Angels (1957)
 The Deep Six (1958) 
 The FBI Story (1959)
 A Distant Trumpet (1964) 
 None but the Brave (1965)

External links

1898 births
1976 deaths
American male screenwriters
People from Albany, Missouri
Screenwriters from Missouri
20th-century American male writers
20th-century American screenwriters